All Saints Anglican Church is an Anglican church in Raleigh, North Carolina. The church is a member of the Anglican Church in North America through its parent jurisdiction, the Reformed Episcopal Church. All Saints built its own building in 2015 located at 908 Deboy St Raleigh NC.

References

Churches in Raleigh, North Carolina
Reformed Episcopal church buildings